Joculator mygaki is a species of minute sea snail, a marine gastropod mollusc in the family Cerithiopsidae. The species was described by Jay and Drivas in 2002.

Distribution
This marine species occurs off Southern Madagascar and Réunion.

References

 Cecalupo A. & Perugia I. (2014). The Cerithiopsidae (Caenogastropoda: Triphoroidea) of South Madagascar (Indian Ocean). Bollettino Malacologico. 50: 75-126

External links
 Jay M. & Drivas J. (2002). The Cerithiopsidae (Gastropoda) of Reunion Island (Indian Ocean). Novapex. 3(1): 1-45

Gastropods described in 2002
mygaki